Kaylan Drake Burnette is an American actress and fashion model.

Early life and career 
Burnette was born in Houston, Texas, and studied art history at the University of Texas before moving to Los Angeles, California, hoping to intern as a production assistant. Instead she was cast as "Marfa Girl" in Larry Clark's feature film. In a New York Times review, A. O. Scott opined that although Burnette didn't "have much craft as an actress", she approached the role with a "sense of humor".
As a model, Burnette was (coincidentally) discovered in Marfa, Texas while on vacation in 2013. She debuted at Celine's pre-fall 2013 fashion show, and has walked for designers like Marc Jacobs, Christopher Kane, Fendi, Marni, Missoni, Acne Studios, Stella McCartney, Louis Vuitton, Chanel, Hermès, Burberry, and Isabel Marant.

Burnette is pursuing a master's degree in filmmaking from New York University's Tisch School of the Arts.

References 

Living people
University of Texas alumni
People from Houston
Models from Houston
Female models from Texas
People from Austin, Texas
People from New York City
Actresses from Houston
Tisch School of the Arts alumni
1985 births